Aureus, golden in Latin, may refer to :
 Aureus, a gold coin of ancient Rome valued at 25 silver denarii
 Aureus (saint), 5th century German saint
 Vitulus Aureus (the golden calf), a book by Dutch alchemist Johann Friedrich Schweitze
 a jewellery brand owned by F. Hinds

See also 
 Aurea (disambiguation)